Klimecki is a Polish surname. Notable people with the surname include:

 Stanisław Klimecki (1883–1942), Mayor of Kraków
 Tadeusz Klimecki, Polish general
 , Polish boxer

Polish-language surnames
Surnames from given names